New York's 11th congressional district is a congressional district for the United States House of Representatives in New York City. The 11th district includes all of Staten Island and parts of southern Brooklyn, including the neighborhoods of Bay Ridge, Bath Beach, Dyker Heights, south western Gravesend, western Sheepshead Bay, and parts of southern Bensonhurst. The 11th District is currently represented by Republican Nicole Malliotakis, who is currently, along with George Santos of New York's 3rd district,  one of only two Republicans that represent any part of New York City in Congress. Malliotakis was first elected in 2020, defeating one-term incumbent Democrat Max Rose.

The district's character is very different from the rest of New York City. It is the only district in the city which leans towards the Republican Party in national elections, and the only one carried by Donald Trump in 2020, who won it with 55 percent of the vote to Democratic opponent Joe Biden's 44 percent.

Demographics 
According to the APM Research Lab's Voter Profile Tools (featuring the U.S. Census Bureau's 2019 American Community Survey), the district contained about 499,000 potential voters (citizens, age 18+). Of these, 64% are White, 15% Latino, 12% Black, and 8% Asian. Immigrants make up 29% of the district's potential voters. The district has significant Italian-American, Jewish, Irish-American, and Russian-American populations. Median income among households (with one or more potential voter) in the district is about $85,200. As for the educational attainment of potential voters in the district, 10% of those 25 and older have not earned a high school degree, while 38% hold a bachelor's or higher degree.

History 
Prior to the 2012 redistricting, most of the territory currently located in the 11th district had been located in New York's 13th congressional district, while the 11th district was located entirely in Brooklyn and had a majority African-American population. Most of the territory located within the old 11th district is now located in New York's 9th congressional district. The old 11th district was the subject of The Colbert Report's Better Know a District segment on December 15, 2005, and September 4, 2012.

Voting

List of members representing the district

Election results

In New York State there are numerous minor parties at various points on the political spectrum. Certain parties will invariably endorse either the Republican or Democratic candidate for every office, hence the state electoral results contain both the party votes, and the final candidate votes (Listed as "Recap"). (See .)

See also

List of United States congressional districts
New York's congressional districts
United States congressional delegations from New York

References

 Congressional Biographical Directory of the United States 1774–present
 1996 House election data, Clerk of the House of Representatives
 1998 House election data, Clerk of the House of Representatives
 2000 House election data, Clerk of the House of Representatives
 2002 House election data, Clerk of the House of Representatives
 2004 House election data, Clerk of the House of Representatives

11
Politics of Brooklyn
Constituencies established in 1803
1803 establishments in New York (state)